Rostellariella barbieri is a species of sea snail, a marine gastropod mollusk in the family Strombidae, the true conchs.

Description

Distribution

References

Strombidae
Gastropods described in 2008